The 2021 Kutztown Golden Bears football team represented Kutztown University of Pennsylvania during the 2021 NCAA Division II football season.

Schedule

Game summaries

vs. Assumption

at No. 15 IUP

References

Kutztown
Kutztown Golden Bears football seasons
Pennsylvania State Athletic Conference football champion seasons
Kutztown Golden Bears football